Naval Air Station Fallon or NAS Fallon  is the United States Navy's premier air-to-air and air-to-ground training facility. It is located southeast of the city of Fallon, east of Reno in western Nevada. Since 1996, it has been home to the U.S. Navy-Fighter Weapons School (TOPGUN) taking over from the former NAS Miramar in California, and the surrounding area contains  of bombing and electronic warfare ranges. It is also home to the Naval Aviation Warfighting Development Center (NAWDC), which includes TOPGUN, the Carrier Airborne Early Warning Weapons School (CAEWWS) and the Navy Rotary Wing Weapons School Combat Search and Rescue (CSAR) training also takes place there.

The airfield is named Van Voorhis Field in honor of Commander Bruce Van Voorhis (1908–1943) who was awarded a posthumous Medal of Honor.

History
The airfield at NAS Fallon was originally built in 1942 as part of a defensive network to repel a feared Japanese invasion of the west coast. It was soon taken over by the Navy for training use and has been used as such ever since with the exception of the period of 1946 to 1951, during which it was used by the Bureau of Indian Affairs. During the years prior to 1972, the base was known as Naval Auxiliary Air Station and was heavily used during the Vietnam War by various squadrons that rotated through the base before deploying to carriers headed for Vietnam. During these same years prior to 1972, many ground troops were temporarily assigned to NAAS Fallon for their hot weather training (during the summer months) and cold weather training (during the winter months). On 1 January 1972, the Navy recognized NAS Fallon's importance to naval aviation by upgrading the base from auxiliary air station status to a major aviation command as a full-fledged naval air station. While NAS Fallon provides training for visiting carrier air wings, Strike Fighter Squadron 127 (VFA-127), the "Desert Bogeys", was the air station's only permanently based squadron from October 1987 until it was disestablished on 23 March 1996.

The NAS Fallon was featured in the 1986 action blockbuster movie Top Gun, starring Tom Cruise, with scenes of aerial dogfighting.

The Navy relocated its Navy Fighter Weapons School, or TOPGUN, and the Carrier Airborne Early Warning Weapons School (CAEWWS) or TOPDOME from NAS Miramar to NAS Fallon in 1996, following the transfer of NAS Miramar to the Marine Corps and its redesignation as MCAS Miramar. This move resulted in the construction of a new ramp, hangars and academic buildings. The new command, the Naval Strike and Air Warfare Center (NSAWC), was established on 11 July 1996 and was a unification of TOPGUN, Strike University (Strike U), the Naval Strike Warfare Center, and TOPDOME, the Carrier Airborne Early Warning Weapons School (CAEWWS). In addition to transferring the NSAWC squadron, a Navy Reserve adversary squadron, Fighter Squadron Composite THIRTEEN (VFC-13), the "Saints," was also permanently relocated from its former base at NAS Miramar to NAS Fallon. As a result, VFC-13 replaced the disestablished VFA-127 in the fighter adversary role.

Associated bombing ranges checker the surrounding Lahontan Valley and Dixie Valley, which is the next valley to the east. Dixie Valley also contains a simulated air defense network, including approximately 20 operational radar installations. Many demilitarized armored vehicles, including some exotics, have been scattered throughout the area, presumably for ambiance. Most of this area is publicly accessible, with the exception of areas immediately surrounding the radar installations. The entire training area surrounding NAS Fallon is known as the Fallon Range Training Complex (FRTC).

USAF Radar Station
Between 1956 and 1975, the United States Air Force Air Defense Command (ADC) operated a General Surveillance Radar station at NAS Fallon. The Air Force area was named Fallon Air Force Station (AFS) and designated ADC site SM-156 (later NORAD site Z-156). The 858th Aircraft Control and Warning Squadron moved to Fallon AFS from Hamilton Air Force Base (AFB), California in the south central section of NAS Fallon in 1956. It initially activated AN/MPS-7 search and AN/MPS-14 height-finder radar sets, and initially the station functioned as a Ground Control Intercept (GCI) and warning station. As a GCI station, the squadron's role was to guide interceptor aircraft toward unidentified intruders picked up on the unit's radar scopes. An AN/FPS-3 search set briefly saw service in 1959.

During 1962 Fallon AFS joined the Semi Automatic Ground Environment (SAGE) system, initially feeding data to DC-16 at Stead AFB, Nevada. After joining, the squadron was redesignated as the 858th Radar Squadron (SAGE) on 1 December 1962. The radar squadron provided information 24/7 the SAGE Direction Center where it was analyzed to determine range, direction altitude speed and whether or not aircraft were friendly or hostile. Also in this time frame, the radar site was relocated from the original location in the south central part of the Naval Air Station grounds to the far southwest corner. At the new SAGE radar site, the squadron used an AN/FPS-35 search radar that replaced the AN/MPS-7 set in 1963. In 1964 an AN/FPS-6 height-finder radar was added.

In addition to the main facility at NAS Fallon, the squadron also operated a remote AN/FPS-14 Gap Filler site:
 Gabbs, NV (SM-156A): 

Around 1965, Fallon became an FAA/ADC joint-use facility. The AN/MPS-14 radar was retired in 1969. In the early 1970s, the AN/FPS-35 was replaced with an AN/FPS-66A.

Over the years, the equipment at the station was upgraded or modified to improve the efficiency and accuracy of the information gathered by the radars. The 858th Radar Sq was inactivated and replaced by the 858th Air Defense Group in March 1970. The upgrade to group status was done because of Fallon AFS' status as a Backup Interceptor Control (BUIC) master control center site. BUIC sites were alternate control sites in the event that SAGE Direction Centers became disabled and unable to control interceptor aircraft. The group was inactivated and replaced by the 858th Radar Squadron. as defenses against manned bombers were reduced only to be inactivated in June 1975. The group was disbanded in 1984. The FAA retained the AN/FPS-66A search radar, still in-use today and is networked into the Joint Surveillance System (JSS); the radar tower still is painted with red-and-white checkerboard.

Museum
The navy maintains the Naval Air Station Fallon Air Park museum on the base.

Search and rescue team
Since 1972 the base has had its own search and rescue team. Originally named Desert Angels and later renamed Longhorns, the team's mission was to provide SAR support for visiting Carrier Air Groups and other NAS Fallon tenant commands. The Longhorns flew the Bell UH-1N from 1972 to 2009 and the Sikorsky SH-60F from 2009 to 2011. The team flew the Sikorsky MH-60S. The Longhorns frequently supported civilian search, rescue and medical evacuation efforts in conjunction with local law enforcement, medical and search and rescue agencies. The unit was disbanded during February 2022 with the aircraft being transferred to the NAWDC at Fallon.

Gallery

See also 
 List of United States Navy airfields

References

Notes

Bibliography

Further reading
  (USAF Radar site)
 STRIKE: U.S. Naval Strike Warfare Center (Presidio Press) by John Joss, photography by George Hall.

External links
 
 
 

 
 
 

Fallon
Airports in Nevada
Buildings and structures in Churchill County, Nevada
Military installations in Nevada
Airports established in 1944
Historic American Buildings Survey in Nevada
1944 establishments in Nevada